, also Choji Kishaba, (1934 - October 20, 2017) was an Okinawan martial arts master and founder of the Ryukyu Bujutsu Kenkyu Doyukai (RBKD).

Kishaba's older brother, Chokei Kishaba, was also an Okinawan martial arts master.

Ryukyu Bujutsu Kenkyu Doyukai 

Kishaba was one of the very few remaining practitioners of Yamane Ryu in Okinawa. In 1985 Kishaba and Toshihiro Oshiro founded the RBKD, an organization dedicated to the research and development of Okinawan Martial Arts. Oshiro's dojo is located in San Mateo, California.

References

See also 

Okinawan martial arts

Okinawan male karateka
Living people
Ryukyuan people
Year of birth missing (living people)